Idukki Lok Sabha constituency is one of the 20 Lok Sabha (parliamentary) constituencies in the Indian state of Kerala.

Assembly segments

Idukki Lok Sabha constituency is composed of the following assembly segments:

Members of Parliament 

As Peermade

As Idukki

Election results

General election 2019

General election 2014

See also
 Idukki district
 List of Constituencies of the Lok Sabha
 Indian general election, 2014 (Kerala)
 2014 Indian general election

Notes

References

External links
 Election Commission of India: https://web.archive.org/web/20081218010942/http://www.eci.gov.in/StatisticalReports/ElectionStatistics.asp
 2019 General Election Idukki Constituency Live Results

Lok Sabha constituencies in Kerala
Politics of Idukki district